Christie Jayaseelan Devasagayam (born 18 August 1986) is a Malaysian footballer who last plays for Sarawak United in the Malaysia Premier League.

Club career
Christie started his career in football with PKNS FC football academy in 2005. Then, he was promoted to the senior squad and played with the club for five seasons. In 2011 Malaysia Premier League season, he helps his team becomes the champion and promoted to the Malaysia Super League for 2012 season.

However, he joins ATM FA alongside national team players Mohd Aidil Zafuan Abdul Radzak and Mohd Azmi Muslim which competed in the 2012 Malaysia Premier League season.

Christie joined Sarawak United FC for the 2021 Malaysia Premier League. He scored on his  debut against Kelantan United on 7 March 2021.

International career
Christie had made his debut for his country in a friendly match against Barcelona and Vietnam. On 8 October 2015, Christie scored two goals against Laos.

References

External links
 

1986 births
Living people
Malaysian footballers
Malaysia international footballers
People from Selangor
Malaysian sportspeople of Indian descent
Malaysian people of Tamil descent
PKNS F.C. players
ATM FA players
Sarawak United FC players
Malaysia Super League players
Malaysia Premier League players
Association football wingers